The 1910 Brown Bears football team represented Brown University as an independent during the 1910 college football season. Led by ninth-year head coach Edward N. Robinson, Brown compiled a record of 7–2–1.

Schedule

References

Brown
Brown Bears football seasons
Brown Bears football